Lake D'Arbonne State Park is  in size and lies in a hilly region adjacent to Lake D'Arbonne in Union Parish, Louisiana, USA. It can be reached by taking La.

The state park is a popular place to play disc golf, fish, camp and hike. Accommodations at the park include 58 campsites (51 improved, 7 deluxe), 16 cabins and 2 lodges. A network of hiking and walking trails go throughout the park (one of which has one of the most grueling and difficult disc golf courses in the world). The four main trails are color-coded Orange, Green, White and Blue. Visitors may rent kayaks, by the day or hour. It is also the only State Park in Louisiana with tennis courts.

Wildlife is abundant in the mixed pine-hardwood forest at Lake D'Arbonne and deer sightings occur regularly.

References

External links

Lake D'Arbonne State Park - Louisiana Office of State Parks

State parks of Louisiana
Protected areas of Union Parish, Louisiana